FC Uttar Bongo is a Bangladeshi football club based on Kurigram. It currently plays in Dhaka Third Division Football League, the third tier of football in Dhaka and the fifth-highest tier overall in the Bangladeshi football league system.

It also runs a women's team in the Bangladesh Women's Football League, the top-tier football league in Bangladeshi women's football.

History
FC Uttar Bongo, established in 2019, is a club which mainly focuses on grassroot football development. They started their journey as a football club by participating in 2019-20 BFF U-15 Pioneer Football League. The U-15 team qualified for Super League in their debut season.

During their debut season, they were runners-up in the Pioneer League, losing to Elias Ahemd Chowdhury SS 2–1. Nontheless, they were able to earn promotion to the 2021–22 Dhaka Third Division Football League, as one of the four top-finishing team's in the Pioneer League.

The club also represents Bangladesh at the North Bengal International Gold Cup, a tournament which is held to strengthen the friendship between Bangladesh and India.

Personnel

Current technical staff

Board of Directors

References

Football clubs in Bangladesh
Association football clubs established in 2019
2019 establishments in Bangladesh